"Fidelity" is a song by American singer-songwriter Regina Spektor, released as the second single from her fourth album Begin to Hope. The song marked Spektor's first and only Billboard 100 entry and is her most successful track to date. Despite a release date of September 25 (its popular music video was released even earlier), the song did not hit the charts until December. The song was released in the UK as a two-part single on March 12, 2007. The song makes it Spektor's highest-charting single across the world.

Spektor wrote the song while watching the movie High Fidelity, which is based on a book by Nick Hornby.

The single was certified gold by the RIAA for sales of 500,000 copies. and single released from her album Begin to Hope  which was her most successful single in United States. As of 2009 the single has sold 716,000 copies in United States.

Music video
It is directed by Marc Webb. The video features Spektor in a black and white dress in an abstract environment enjoying tea alone. The room and decor are also black and white. As the video progresses, an empty suit is shown, which Spektor converses with as though it were a real companion. Near the end of the video, Spektor drops a heart pendant on the ground, revealing colored dust. A man (played by Scoot McNairy) appears in the suit, and the two then play with the dust, and join hands as the video ends.

Track listing
UK CD 1
 "Fidelity"
 "Music Box"

UK CD 2
 "Fidelity"
 "Music Box"
 "December"
 "Fidelity" (Enhanced Video)

UK digital download/AUS CD
 "Fidelity"
 "Music Box"
 "December"

Chart performance
"Fidelity" initially made an appearance on the Billboard Bubbling Under chart at #8 (The equivalent to a #108) on December 6. Two weeks later, Spektor made her first appearance in her career on the Billboard Hot 100 as "Fidelity" entered at #98. It climbed for the following two weeks before disappearing and then reappearing at #58 on the Billboard Hot 100 and #36 on the Billboard Hot Digital Songs in early 2007.

Fidelity debuted on the New Zealand RIANZ charts at #16, because digital downloads had been added in the week of its debut. This song would have achieved a higher placing if digital downloads had been included earlier, as shown by the single's concurrent top ranking at the New Zealand iTunes Store.

In 2009, the popularity of Spektor's single "Laughing With" has caused a revival in sales of Fidelity, bringing it to #55 on the Alternative Songs Chart on US iTunes.

Charts

In popular culture
In 2009, the song was used with permission as accompaniment to the video, "Don't divorce us", released by the Courage Campaign against Proposition 8. The video was viewed over 500,000 times in a week.

In the 2010 20th Century Fox film Love & Other Drugs, directed by Edward Zwick, the song can be heard as the film's credits are rolled.

The song was also used in Veronica Mars, Brothers & Sisters, A Favorita, Grey's Anatomy, Secret Diary of a Call Girl, 27 Dresses, Love & Other Drugs, Las Vegas (TV series).

References

External links
Fidelity video on MySpaceTV

2006 singles
Music videos directed by Marc Webb
Regina Spektor songs
Sire Records singles
2006 songs
Songs written by Regina Spektor
Song recordings produced by David Kahne